Tomaž Zupančič, better known under his pen name Avgust Demšar, (born 1962 in Maribor) is a Slovenian writer who specialises in detective fiction.

References

External links 
 Avgust Demšar on Dream Publisher web site
 Avgust Demšar on Facebook

1962 births
Living people
Writers from Maribor